Colm McDonald is an Irish psychiatrist and a professor of psychiatry at the National University of Ireland, Galway (NUIG).

Education 
He graduated Doctor of Medicine in University College Dublin, and then became a resident physician at the Department of Psychiatry King's College London. He also received his Ph.D. from the Institute of Psychiatry, Psychology and Neuroscience at King's College, London.

Academic career
McDonald is professor of psychiatry and director of the Clinical Neuroimaging Laboratory at NUIG.

References

External links

Alumni of the University of Galway
Academics of the University of Galway
Academics of King's College London
Living people
Irish psychiatrists
Year of birth missing (living people)